Samuel Davis Woods (September 19, 1845 – December 24, 1915) was an American lawyer and politician who served as a U.S. Representative from California from 1900 to 1903, as a member of the Republican Party.

Biography 
Born in Mount Pleasant, Tennessee, Woods moved with his parents to Stockton, California, in February 1850. He attended public schools and studied law. He was admitted to the California bar in April 1875 and engaged in practice in Stockton and in the city and county of San Francisco.

Congress 
Woods was elected as a Republican to the Fifty-sixth Congress to fill the vacancy caused by the resignation of Marion De Vries. He was reelected to the Fifty-seventh Congress and served from December 3, 1900, to March 3, 1903. He was not a candidate for reelection in 1902 to the Fifty-eighth Congress.

Later career and death 
He resumed the practice of law in San Francisco, California, and died there December 24, 1915. He was interred in Mount Olivet Cemetery, California.

References

External links

1845 births
1915 deaths
People from Mount Pleasant, Tennessee
Politicians from Stockton, California
California lawyers
Republican Party members of the United States House of Representatives from California
19th-century American politicians
19th-century American lawyers